Botiller is a surname. Notable people with the surname include:

Dick Botiller (1896–1953), American actor
Dionisio Botiller (1842–1915), American politician

See also
Botiller v. Dominguez, a United States Supreme Court case